Zia Soul is an album by Red Earth, released in 2003. It won "World Music Album of the Year" at the 2003 Native American Music Awards.  "Fly to the Sun" featured production by Wil-Dog Abers of Ozomatli, who worked with the group on preproduction.

Track listing
 Intro: US Highway 666
 Fly to the Sun
 Antenado
 Key of Pain
 Phat Albert, Jr.
 Red Delicious
 The Fourth World
 Life in Babylon
 Waiting for the Rain
 Pouring Down
 Rez Rocket
 The Atomic Batucada
 Santa Fake
 More American
 4:38
 Zia Soul
 Outro: The End of the Trail

Personnel
Red Earth:
Ira Wilson – Lead Vocals, Background Vocals, Lead & Rhythm Guitar
Jeff Duneman – drums, percussion, Background Vocals
Carlo Bluehouse Johnson – Lead & Rhythm Guitar, Bass guitar, Background Vocals
Hideki Imai – Trombone, Background Vocals, Percussion, Lead Vocals
John Simms – Trumpet, Trombone, Background Vocals, Synthesizer
Captain Raab – Bass guitar, Guitar, Synthesizer, Background Vocals, Drum Machine
Ernesto Encinas – Saxophone, Background Vocals
Christian Orellano – percussion, Background Vocals
Charley Baca – guitar

2003 albums
Red Earth (band) albums